Auglandsbukta is a neighbourhood in the city of Kristiansand in Agder county, Norway.  The neighborhood is located in the borough of Vågsbygd and in the district of Vågsbygd.  There is a large marina harbour and park located in the cove of Auglandsbukta. There is also a gas station and some real estate offices at Auglandsbukta. Auglandsbukta is next to Norwegian County Road 456.  Augland lies to the west and Skyllingsheia lies to the north.

References

Geography of Kristiansand
Neighbourhoods of Kristiansand